Sunday Morning Coming Down is a Johnny Cash album, released in 1972.
It is a compilation of previously released tracks. It consists of songs previously recorded on albums made from prison concerts or live albums and has songs such as  "Folsom Prison Blues", "Orange Blossom Special", "Understand Your Man", and "Sunday Morning Coming Down".

The album was re-issued in 1999 without adding any new songs.

Track listing

Charts
Album – Billboard (United States)

References

1972 compilation albums
Johnny Cash compilation albums